Zakhysnykiv Ukrainy (meaning: Defenders of Ukraine) is a station on Kharkiv Metro's Oleksiivska Line. The station opened on 6 May 1995.

Prior to 17 May 2016, the station's name was Ploshcha Povstannia (Площа Повстання, 'Rebellion Square'). It was renamed conformed with the law banning Communist names in Ukraine.

References

External links
 

Kharkiv Metro stations
Railway stations opened in 1995